This is a list of described Culex species around the world, as of 2006. Subspecies have been omitted. There are possibly errors and inaccuracies in this list that stem from the conversion from the source. Please check the original source when in doubt.

Subgenus Acalleomyia Leicester
Culex obscurus (Leicester, 1908) — Indonesia, Malaysia

Subgenus Acallyntrum Stone & Penn
Culex axillicola Steffan, 1979 — Papua New Guinea
Culex belkini Stone & Penn, 1948 — Solomon Islands
Culex bicki Stone & Penn, 1947 — Indonesia
Culex binigrolineatus Knight & Rozeboom, 1945 — Indonesia
Culex bougainvillensis Steffan, 1979 — Solomon Islands
Culex miyagii Mogi & Toma, 1999 — Indonesia
Culex pallidiceps (Theobald, 1905) — Papua New Guinea
Culex perkinsi Stone & Penn, 1948 — Solomon Islands

Subgenus Aedinus Lutz
Culex accelerans Root, 1927 — Brazil, Panama, Trinidad and Tobago, French Guiana
Culex amazonensis (Lutz, 1905) — Brazil, Colombia, Panama, Suriname, Trinidad and Tobago, Venezuela, French Guiana
Culex clastrieri Casal & Garcia, 1968 — Brazil
Culex guyanensis Clastrier, 1970 — French Guiana
Culex hildebrandi Evans, 1923
Culex paraplesia Dyar, 1922
Culex tapena Dyar, 1919

Subgenus Afroculex Danilov
Culex lineata (Theobald, 1912) — Mozambique, South Africa

Subgenus Allimanta Casal & Garcia
Culex tramazayguesi Duret, 1954 — Argentina

Subgenus Anoedioporpa Dyar
Culex bamborum Rozeboom & Komp, 1948 — Colombia
Culex belemensis Duret & Damasceno, 1955 — Brazil, French Guiana
Culex bifoliata Dyar, 1922
Culex browni Komp, 1936 — Colombia, Panama
Culex canaanensis Lane & Whitman, 1943 — Brazil
Culex chaguanco Casal, Garcia, & Fernandez, 1968 — Argentina
Culex chalcocorystes Martini, 1914
Culex conservator Dyar & Knab, 1906 — Belize, Brazil, Colombia, Costa Rica, Guatemala, Honduras, Mexico, Panama, Peru, Suriname, Trinidad and Tobago, Venezuela, Lesser Antilles
Culex corrigani Dyar & Knab, 1907 — Colombia, Costa Rica, Nicaragua, Panama
Culex damascenoi Duret, 1969 — Brazil
Culex divisior Dyar & Knab, 1906
Culex luteopleurus (Theobald, 1903) — Brazil
Culex menui Clastrier, 1971 — French Guiana
Culex originator Gordon & Evans, 1922 — Brazil, Grenada, French Guiana
Culex paganus Evans, 1923 — Brazil, Venezuela
Culex quasioriginator Duret, 1972 — Brazil
Culex restrictor Dyar & Knab, 1906 — Belize, Costa Rica, El Salvador, Honduras, Mexico, Panama
Culex surukumensis Anduze, 1941

Subgenus Barraudius Edwards
Culex modestus Ficalbi, 1889 — Algeria, China, Czech Republic, Greece, Hungary, Iran, Iraq, Israel, Italy, Mongolia, Morocco, Poland, Romania, Russia, Slovakia, Spain, Tajikistan, Turkey, United Kingdom
Culex eadithae Barraud, 1924
Culex nudipalpis Shingarev, 1927
Culex tanajcus Stschelkanovzev, 1926 — Japan, Korea
Culex pusillus Macquart, 1850 — Algeria, Egypt, Greece, Iran, Iraq, Libya, Saudi Arabia, Sudan, Syria, Tajikistan, Tunisia, Turkey, Turkmenistan, United Arab Emirates, Uzbekistan
Culex richeti Brunhes & Venhard, 1966 — Nigeria

Subgenus Belkinomyia Adames & Galindo
Culex eldridgei Adames & Galindo, 1973 — Colombia

Subgenus Carrollia Lutz
Culex anduzei Cerqueira & Lane, 1944 — Brazil
Culex antunesi Lane & Whitman, 1943 — Brazil, Colombia, Costa Rica, Panama, French Guiana
Culex monaensis Floch & Fauran, 1955
Culex babahoyensis Levi-Castillo, 1953 — Costa Rica, Ecuador, Nicaragua
Culex bihaicola Dyar & Nunez Tovar, 1927 — Colombia, Costa Rica, Ecuador, Guatemala, Mexico, Panama, Venezuela
Culex bonnei Dyar, 1921 — Brazil, Colombia, Ecuador, Suriname, French Guiana
Culex cerqueirai Valencia, 1973 — Panama
Culex guerreroi Cova Garcia, Sutil, & Pulido, 1971 — Venezuela
Culex infoliatus Bonne-Wepster & Bonne, 1919 — Brazil, Ecuador, Peru, Suriname, Venezuela, French Guiana
Culex insigniforceps Clastrier & Claustre, 1978 — French Guiana
Culex iridescens (Lutz, 1905) — Brazil
Culex kompi Valencia, 1973 — Colombia
Culex metempsytus Dyar, 1921 — Colombia, Costa Rica, Guatemala, Panama
Culex rausseoi Cova Garcia, Sutil & Pulido, 1972 — Venezuela
Culex secundus Bonne-Wepster & Bonne, 1919 — Brazil, Colombia, Costa Rica, Ecuador, Panama
Culex soperi Antunes & Lane, 1937 — Argentina, Brazil
Culex urichii (Coquillett, 1906) — Belize, Bolivia, Brazil, Colombia, Costa Rica, Ecuador, Panama, Peru, Suriname, Trinidad and Tobago, Venezuela
Culex mathesoni Anduze, 1942
Culex wannonii Cova Garcia & Sutil Oramus, 1976 — Venezuela
Culex wilsoni Lane & Whitman, 1943 — Brazil, Colombia

Subgenus Culex Linnaeus

Culex abnormalis Lane, 1936 — Brazil, Colombia
Culex abyssinicus Van Someren, 1945 — Angola, Cameroon, Central African Republic, Congo, Ghana, Kenya, Namibia, Senegal, Sierra Leone, South Africa, Sudan, Zaire
Culex accraensis Theobald, 1909
Culex acer Walker, 1848
Culex acharistus Root, 1927 — Argentina, Brazil, Chile
Culex adelae Baisas, 1938
Culex aestuans Wiedemann, 1828
Culex affinis Adams, 1903
Culex afridii Qutubuddin., 1956
Culex agilis Bigot, 1889
Culex aglischrus Dyar, 1924
Culex aikenii Dyar & Knab, 1908
Culex alani Forattini, 1965 — Colombia
Culex albertoi Anduze, 1943
Culex albigenu Enderlein, 1920
Culex albinervis Edwards, 1929 — Fiji, Tonga
Culex albolineatus Giles, 1901
Culex albovirgetus Graham, 1910
Culex albus Leicester, 1908
Culex alienus Colless, 1957 — Malaysia, Singapore, Thailand, Vietnam
Culex alis Theobald, 1903 — Indonesia, Malaysia, Philippines, Singapore, Taiwan, Thailand, Vietnam
Culex alpha Seguy., 1924
Culex alticola Martini, 1931
Culex ambiguus Theobald, 1903
Culex ameliae Casal, 1967 — Argentina
Culex anarmostus Theobald, 1903
Culex andersoni Edwards, 1914 — Kenya, Malawi, Tanzania, Uganda, Zaire, Ethiopia
Culex annulata Taylor, 1914
Culex annulioris Theobald, 1901 — Zimbabwe, Tropical Africa
Culex annulirostris Skuse, 1889 — Australia, Fiji, Indonesia, Kiribati, Nauru, Palau, Papua New Guinea, Philippines, Solomon Islands, Tonga, Vanuatu, New Caledonia, Tuvalu, Cook Islands
Culex annuliventris (Blanchard, 1852. In Gay 1852) — Chile
Culex annulus Theobald, 1901 — China, Indonesia, Philippines
Culex antennatus (Becker, 1903) — Angola, Botswana, Egypt, Iran, Israel, Jordan, Madagascar
Culex anxifer Bigot, 1859
Culex apicinus Philippi, 1865 — Bolivia, Chile, Peru
Culex aquarius Strickman, 1990 — Costa Rica
Culex aquilus Graham, 1910
Culex arabiensis Theobald, 1913
Culex archegus Dyar, 1929 — Colombia, Ecuador, Peru
Culex argenteopunctatus (Ventrillon, 1905) — Madagascar, Mozambique
Culex argenteus Ludlow, 1905
Culex articularis Philippi, 1865 — Argentina, Chile, Ecuador, Peru
Culex aseyehae Dyar & Knab, 1915
Culex asteliae Belkin, 1968 — New Zealand
Culex astridianus de Meillon, 1942 — Zaire
Culex ataeniatus Theobald, 1911 — South Africa
Culex atriceps Edwards, 1926 — French Polynesia
Culex aurantapex Edwards, 1914 — Kenya, Mozambique, South Africa, Zaire, Ethiopia
Culex auritaenia Enderlein, 1920
Culex australicus Dobrotworsky & Drummond, 1953 — Australia, Vanuatu, New Caledonia
Culex autogenicus Roubaud, 1935
Culex autumnalis Weyenbergh, 1882
Culex azoriensis Theobald, 1903
Culex azuayus Levi-Castillo, 1954
Culex badgeri Dyar, 1924
Culex bahamensis Dyar & Knab, 1906 — Bahamas, Cuba, Jamaica, United States, Puerto Rico, Virgin Islands, Grand Cayman Islands
Culex bancroftii Theobald, 1901
Culex banksensis Maffi & Tenorio, 1977 — Vanuatu
Culex barbarus Dyar & Knab, 1906
Culex barraudi Edwards, 1922 — China, India, Nepal, Pakistan, Sri Lanka, Thailand
Culex basicinctus Edwards, 1922
Culex beauperthuyi Anduze, 1943
Culex berbericus Roubaud, 1935
Culex beta Séguy, 1924 — Algeria
Culex bickleyi Forattini, 1965 — Colombia
Culex bicolor Meigen, 1818
Culex bidens Dyar, 1922 — Argentina, Bolivia, Brazil, Mexico, Paraguay, Uruguay, Venezuela
Culex bifoliata Theobald, 1905
Culex bifurcatus Linnaeus, 1758
Culex bihamatus Edwards, 1926 — Indonesia
Culex bilineatus Theobald, 1903
Culex biocellatus Theobald, 1903
Culex bipunctata Theobald, 1907
Culex biroi Theobald, 1905
Culex boneriensis Brethes, 1916
Culex bonneae Dyar & Knab, 1919 — Brazil, Colombia, Costa Rica, Panama, Suriname, French Guiana
Culex brami Forattini, Rabello, & Lopes, 1967 — Brazil
Culex brehmei Knab, 1916
Culex brethesi Dyar, 1919 — Argentina, Uruguay
Culex brevispinosus Bonne-Wepster & Bonne, 1919 — Brazil, Colombia, Suriname, Venezuela
Culex brumpti Galliard, 1931 — France, Morocco
Culex bukavuensis Wolfs, 1947 — Zaire
Culex calcitrans Robineau-Desvoidy, 1827
Culex calloti Rioux & Pech, 1959
Culex calurus Edwards, 1935 — Kenya
Culex camposi Dyar, 1925 — Colombia, Ecuador, Peru
Culex caraibeus Howard, Dyar, & Knab, 1912
Culex carcinoxenus De Oliveira Castro, 1932 — Brazil
Culex carleti Brunhes & Ravaonjanahary, 1971 — Madagascar, Comoros
Culex carmodyae Dyar & Knab, 1906
Culex cartroni Ventrillon, 1905
Culex castelli Hamon, 1957 — Côte d'Ivoire
Culex castroi Casal & Garcia, 1967 — Argentina, Uruguay
Culex cheni Ho., 1963
Culex chidesteri Dyar, 1921 — Argentina, Belize, Brazil, Colombia, Costa Rica, Cuba, Ecuador, Jamaica, Mexico, Panama, Paraguay, United States, Uruguay, Venezuela, Puerto Rico, Lesser Antilles
Culex chitae Duret, 1967 — Colombia
Culex chloroventer Theobald, 1909
Culex chorleyi Edwards, 1941 — Ethiopia, South Africa, Uganda, Zaire
Culex christophersii Theobald, 1907
Culex cingulatus Doleschall, 1856
Culex comitatus Dyar & Knab, 1909
Culex comorensis Brunhes, 1977 — Comoros
Culex condylodesmus Gruenberg, 1905
Culex confusus Baisas, 1938
Culex congolensis Evans, 1923
Culex consimilis Taylor, 1913
Culex consobrinus Robineau-Desvoidy, 1827
Culex cornutus Edwards, 1922 — India
Culex coronator Dyar & Knab, 1906 — Argentina, Belize, Bolivia, Brazil, Colombia, Costa Rica, El Salvador, Guatemala, Honduras, Nicaragua, Panama, Paraguay, Peru, Suriname, Trinidad and Tobago, United States, Uruguay, Venezuela, French Guiana
Culex covagarciai Porattini, — Venezuela
Culex creticus Theobald, 1903
Culex crinicauda Edwards, 1921 — Australia
Culex cubensis Bigot, 1857
Culex cuneatus Theobald, 1901
Culex curvibrachius Angulo, 1993 — Chile
Culex cuyanus Duret, 1968 — Argentina
Culex deanei Correa & Ramalho, 1959
Culex debilis Dyar & Knab, 1914
Culex decens Theobald, 1901 — Ghana, Nigeria, Sierra Leone, South Africa, Yemen, Comoros
Culex declarator Dyar & Knab, 1906 — Belize, Bolivia, Brazil, Costa Rica, El Salvador, Guyana, Mexico, Panama, Paraguay, Suriname, Trinidad and Tobago, United States, Uruguay, Venezuela, French Guiana, Lesser Antilles
Culex delys Howard, Dyar, & Knab, 1915 — Panama
Culex demeilloni Doucet, 1950 — Madagascar
Culex dictator Dyar & Knab, 1909
Culex didieri Neveu-Lemaire, 1906
Culex diengensis Brug, 1931 — Indonesia
Culex diplophyllum Dyar, 1929 — Peru
Culex dipseticus Dyar & Knab, 1909
Culex disjunctus Roubaud, 1957
Culex dissimilis Theobald, 1901
Culex dohenyi Hogue, 1975 — Costa Rica
Culex doleschallii Giles, 1900
Culex doliorum Edwards, 1912
Culex dolosus (Lynch Arribalzaga, 1891) — Argentina, Bolivia, Brazil, Chile, Ecuador, Paraguay, Uruguay
Culex domesticus Leicester, 1908
Culex duplicator Dyar & Knab, 1909 — Dominican Republic, Haiti
Culex duttoni Theobald, 1901 — Angola, Benin, Cameroon, Ethiopia, Ghana, Kenya, Malawi, Nigeria, Senegal, Sierra Leone, South Africa, Sudan, Tanzania, Uganda, Yemen, Zimbabwe, Equatorial Guinea
Culex eduardoi Casal & Garcia, 1968 — Argentina
Culex edwardsi Barraud, 1923 — Australia, India, Nepal, Philippines, Sri Lanka
Culex eleuthera Dyar, 1917
Culex elocutilis Dyar & Knab, 1909
Culex epidesmus (Theobald, 1910) — Bangladesh, India, Nepal, Pakistan, Sri Lanka
Culex equivocator Dyar & Knab, 1907
Culex erectus Iglisch., 1977
Culex eremita Howard, Dyar, & Knab, 1912
Culex erythrothorax Dyar, 1907 — Mexico, United States
Culex escomeli Brethes, 1920
Culex euclastus Theobald, 1903 — Congo, Nigeria, Uganda, Zaire
Culex eumimetes Dyar & Knab, 1908
Culex exilis Dyar, 1924
Culex extricator Dyar & Knab, 1906
Culex factor Dyar & Knab, 1906
Culex fasciatus Mueller, 1764
Culex fasyi Baisas, 1938 — Philippines
Culex fatigans Wiedemann, 1828
Culex federalis Dyar, 1923
Culex fernandezi Casal, Garcia & Cavalieri, 1966 — Argentina
Culex finlayi Perez Vigueras, 1956
Culex foliaceus Lane, 1945 — Brazil
Culex forattinii Correa & Ramalho, 1959
Culex fouchowensis Theobald, 1901
Culex fuscifurcatus Edwards, 1934
Culex fuscitarsis Barraud, 1924
Culex fuscocephala Theobald, 1907 — Bangladesh, Cambodia, China, India, Indonesia, Japan, Laos, Malaysia, Nepal, Pakistan, Philippines, Singapore, Sri Lanka, Taiwan, Vietnam
Culex fuscus Theobald, 1909
Culex gambiensis Theobald, 1903
Culex gameti Bailly-Choumara, 1966 — Cameroon
Culex garciai Broche, 2000 — Cuba
Culex gelidus Theobald, 1901 — Bangladesh, Cambodia, China, India, Indonesia, Japan, Malaysia, Nepal, Pakistan, Philippines, Sri Lanka, Taiwan, Thailand, Vietnam, Myanmar
Culex geminus Colless, 1955 — Malaysia, Singapore
Culex giganteus Ventrillon, 1906 — Madagascar
Culex globocoxitus Dobrotworsky, 1953 — Australia
Culex gnophodes Theobald, 1903
Culex goughii Theobald, 1911
Culex grahamii Theobald, 1910 — Angola, Burkina Faso, Cameroon, Central African Republic, Congo, Gambia, Ghana, Kenya, Liberia, Madagascar, Nigeria, Senegal, Sudan, Togo, Uganda, Zaire
Culex guayasi Levi-Castillo, 1953 — Ecuador
Culex guiarti Blanchard, 1905 — Burkina Faso, Cameroon, Central African Republic, Congo, Gabon, Gambia, Kenya, Liberia, Madagascar, Mali, Mozambique, Nigeria, Senegal, South Africa, Sudan, Tanzania, Uganda, Zaire
Culex guizhouensis Chen & Zhao, 1985 — China
Culex habilitator Dyar & Knab, 1906 — Dominican Republic, Peru, Trinidad and Tobago, Puerto Rico, Lesser Antilles
Culex haematophagus Ficalbi, 1893
Culex hancocki Edwards, 1930 — Kenya, Uganda
Culex hensemaeon Dyar, 1920
Culex hepperi Casal & Garcia, 1967 — Argentina, Uruguay
Culex hirsutipelpis Theobald, 1901
Culex hopkinsi Edwards, 1932 — Uganda, Zaire
Culex huangae Meng, 1958 — China
Culex hutchinsoni Barraud, 1924 — Bangladesh, Cambodia, India, Malaysia, Nepal, Pakistan, Philippines, Singapore, Thailand, Vietnam, Myanmar
Culex impellens Walker, 1859
Culex incognitus Baisas, 1938 — Indonesia, Philippines
Culex inelegans Dyar, 1920
Culex inflictus Theobald, 1901 — Belize, Colombia, Costa Rica, Cuba, Grenada, Mexico, Panama, Trinidad and Tobago, Venezuela, Lesser Antilles
Culex infula Theobald, 1901 — Bangladesh, India, Indonesia, Malaysia, Myanmar (Burma, Nepal, Philippines, Sri Lanka, Thailand, Vietnam)
Culex ingrami Edwards, 1916 — Cameroon, Central African Republic, Congo, Gabon, Ghana, Liberia, Nigeria, Sierra Leone, Uganda, French Guiana, Zaire
Culex inquisitor Dyar & Knab, 1906
Culex interfor Dyar, 1928 — Argentina
Culex interrogator Dyar & Knab, 1906 — El Salvador, Mexico, Nicaragua, Panama, United States
Culex invidiosus Theobald, 1901 — Cameroon, Gabon, Gambia, Ghana, Kenya, Liberia, Nigeria, Senegal, Sierra Leone, Sudan, Tanzania, Uganda, Zaire
Culex iyengari Mattingly & Rageau, 1958 — New Caledonia
Culex jacksoni Edwards, 1934 — China, India, Korea, Nepal, Russia, Sri Lanka, Taiwan
Culex janitor Theobald, 1903 — Haiti, Jamaica, Puerto Rico
Culex jepsoni Theobald, 1910
Culex jubilator Dyar & Knab, 1907
Culex kangi Lien., 1968
Culex kelloggii Theobald, 1903
Culex kesseli Belkin, 1962 — French Polynesia
Culex kinabaluensis Sirivanakarn, 1976 — Malaysia
Culex lachrimans Dyar & Knab, 1909
Culex lahillei Bachmann & Casal, 1962 — Argentina
Culex lamentator Dyar & Knab, 1906
Culex lateropunctata Theobald, 1907
Culex laticinctus Edwards, 1913 — Djibouti, Ethiopia, Greece, Iran, Israel, Jordan, Lebanon, Morocco, Oman, Portugal, Romania, Saudi Arabia, Spain, Sudan, Syria, Turkey, Yemen, French Equatorial Africa
Culex laticlasper Galindo & Blanton, 1954 — Panama
Culex laurenti Newstead, 1907, in Newstead, Dutton, & Todd 1907
Culex lepostenis Dyar, 1923
Culex levicastilloi Lane, 1945 — Ecuador, Venezuela
Culex litoralis Bohart, 1946 — Singapore, Mariana Islands
Culex litwakae Harbach, 1985 — Kenya
Culex lividocostalis Graham, 1910
Culex longefurcatus Becker, 1903
Culex longicornis Sirivanakarn, 1976 — Thailand
Culex loricatus Leicester, 1908
Culex luteoannulatus Theobald, 1901
Culex luteoebdominalis Theobald, 1910
Culex luteola Theobald, 1910
Culex luteus Meigen, 1804
Culex luzonensis Sirivanakarn, 1976 — Philippines
Culex lygrus Root, 1927 — Brazil
Culex machadoi Mattos, Guedes & Xavier, 1978 — Brazil
Culex macleayi Skuse, 1889
Culex maculipes Theobald, 1904
Culex madagascariensis Ventrillon, 1905
Culex major Edwards, 1935
Culex maracayensis Evans, 1923 — Colombia, Venezuela, Lesser Antilles
Culex marginalis Stephens, 1825
Culex marquesensis Stone & Rosen, 1953 — French Polynesia
Culex masculus Theobald, 1901
Culex mattinglyi Knight, 1953 — Saudi Arabia, Syria, Yemen
Culex mauesensis Lane, 1945 — Brazil
Culex mauritanicus Callot, 1940
Culex maxi Dyar, 1928 — Argentina, Brazil, Paraguay, Uruguay
Culex mayumbae Galliard, 1931
Culex melanorhinus Giles, 1900
Culex meridionalis Leach, 1825
Culex microannulata Theobald, 1907
Culex microannulatus Theobald, 1901
Culex microsquamosus Theobald, 1905
Culex milni Taylor, 1914
Culex mimeticus Noe, 1899 — Bulgaria, China, Greece, India, Iran, Iraq, Israel, Italy, Japan, Jordan, Korea, Lebanon, Malaysia, Morocco, Nepal, Pakistan, Portugal, Russia, Saudi Arabia, Spain, Syria, Turkey, Myanmar, Oriental Region
Culex mimuloides Barraud, 1924 — China, India
Culex mimulus Edwards, 1915 — Australia, Bangladesh, China, India, Indonesia, Malaysia, Nepal, Pakistan, Philippines, Singapore, Sri Lanka, Taiwan, Thailand, Vietnam
Culex minimus Leicester, 1908
Culex minor Theobald, 1908
Culex minutus Theobald, 1905
Culex miraculosus Bonne-Wepster, 1937 — Indonesia
Culex mirificus Edwards, 1913 — Kenya
Culex molestus Forskal, 1775 - Brazil
Culex mollis Dyar & Knab, 1906 — Belize, Brazil, Colombia, Costa Rica, Ecuador, Guyana, Honduras, Mexico, Nicaragua, Panama, Peru, Suriname, Trinidad and Tobago, Venezuela, French Guiana
Culex montforti Ventrillon, 1905
Culex mooseri Vargas & Martinez Palacios, 1954
Culex mortificator Dyar & Knab, 1906
Culex mossmani Taylor, 1915
Culex murrelli Lien, 1968 — China, Malaysia, Taiwan, Thailand, Vietnam
Culex musarum Edwards, 1932 — Kenya, Uganda, Zaire
Culex nakuruensis Mattingly, 1951 — Kenya
Culex neavei Theobald, 1906 — Angola, Ethiopia, Gabon, Madagascar, South Africa, Sudan, Tanzania, Uganda, Zaire
Culex neireti Ventrillon, 1906
Culex neolitoralis Bram, 1976
Culex neomimulus Lien., 1968
Culex neotaeniorhynchus Theobald, 1910
Culex neovishnui Lien, 1968
Culex nigricephala Leicester, 1908
Culex nigriceps Buxton, 1927
Culex nigripalpus Theobald, 1901 — Barbados, Belize, Brazil, Colombia, Costa Rica, Cuba, Dominican Republic, Ecuador, El Salvador, Guatemala, Guyana, Honduras, Jamaica, Mexico, Nicaragua, Panama, Paraguay, Suriname, Trinidad and Tobago, United States, Venezuela, Antilles
Culex nigrirostris Enderlein, 1920
Culex nigrocostalis Theobald, 1909
Culex nilgiricus Edwards, 1916 — India
Culex ninagongoensis Edwards, 1928 — Uganda, Zaire
Culex ocellata Theobald, 1907
Culex ochrecee Theobald,
Culex omani Belkin, 1962 — Indonesia, Solomon Islands
Culex onderstepoortensis Theobald, 1911
Culex orientalis Edwards, 1921 — China, Japan, Korea, Philippines, Russia, Taiwan
Culex ornatothoracis Theobald, 1909 — Ghana, Kenya, Uganda
Culex osakaensis Theobald, 1907
Culex oswaldoi Forattini, 1965 — Brazil
Culex ousqua Dyar, 1918 — Belize, Colombia, Costa Rica, El Salvador, Guatemala, Honduras, Mexico, Nicaragua, Panama
Culex pacificus Edwards, 1916 — Vanuatu
Culex pajoti Ramos & Ribeiro, 1981 — Angola
Culex pallidocephala Theobald, 1904
Culex pallidothoracis Theobald, 1909 — Burkina Faso, Cameroon, Central African Republic, Congo, Gabon, Nigeria, Uganda
Culex pallipes Waltl, 1835
Culex palmi Baisas, 1938
Culex palpalis Taylor, 1912 — Australia, Papua New Guinea
Culex paludis Taylor, 1913
Culex palus Theobald, 1903
Culex par Newstead, 1907
Culex paramaxi Duret, 1968 — Brazil
Culex parvus Taylor, 1912
Culex pavlovsky Shingarev, 1928
Culex penafieli Sanchez, 1885
Culex perexiguus Theobald, 1903 — Greece, Iran, Israel, Jordan, Lebanon, Morocco, Saudi Arabia, Sudan, Syria, Turkey
Culex perfidiosus Edwards, 1914 — Cameroon, Central African Republic, Congo, Gabon, Ghana, Liberia, Madagascar, Nigeria, Zaire
Culex perfuscus Edwards, 1914 — Cameroon, Ethiopia, Gabon, Ghana, Kenya, Liberia, Malawi, Mozambique, Nigeria, Sierra Leone, South Africa, Zaire, French Equatorial Africa
Culex permixtus Hsieh & Liao, 1956
Culex perplexus Leicester, 1908 — India, Indonesia, Malaysia, Papua New Guinea, Philippines, Singapore, Thailand
Culex pervigilans Von Bergroth, 1889 — New Zealand
Culex petersoni Dyar, 1920
Culex pettigrewii Theobald, 1910
Culex philipi Edwards, 1929 — Cameroon, Gambia, Ghana, Nigeria, Senegal, Sierra Leone
Culex philippinensis Sirivanakarn, 1976 — Philippines
Culex phytophagus Ficalbi, 1889
Culex pinarocampa Dyar & Knab, 1908 — Costa Rica, Mexico, Panama
Culex pipiens Linnaeus, 1758 — Argentina, Bosnia & Herzegovina, Bulgaria, Canada, Cyprus, Czech Republic, Egypt, France, Germany, Greece, Hungary, Iran, Israel, Italy, Japan, Jordan, Latvia, Lebanon, Luxembourg, Morocco, Pakistan, Poland, Portugal, Romania, Russia, Saudi Arabia, Slovakia, Spain, Sweden, Tajikistan, Tunisia, Turkey, United Kingdom, United States, Uruguay, Yugoslavia (Serbia and Montenegro)
Culex plegepennis Theobald, 1907
Culex plicatus Olivares, 1993 — Chile
Culex poicilipes (Theobald, 1903) — Nigeria
Culex prasinopleurus Martini, 1914
Culex proclametor Dyar & Knab, 1906
Culex propinquus Colless, 1955 — Singapore
Culex prorimus Dyar & Knab, 1909
Culex prosecutor Séguy, 1927 — France
Culex pruina Theobald, 1901 — Cameroon, Central African Republic, Congo, Gabon, Ghana, Liberia, Nigeria, Sierra Leone, Uganda, French Guiana, Zaire
Culex pseudoannulioris Theobald, 1909 — Gabon, Ghana, Kenya, Liberia, Mozambique, Nigeria, Sierra Leone, Sudan, Tanzania, Uganda, Zaire
Culex pseudoinfula Theobald, 1911
Culex pseudojanthinosoma Senevet & Abonnenc, 1946 — French Guiana
Culex pseudomimeticus Sergent, 1909
Culex pseudopruina Van Someren, 1951 — Uganda
Culex pseudosinensis Colless, 1955 — Cambodia, Malaysia, Singapore, Thailand
Culex pseudostigmatosoma Strickman, 1990 — Honduras
Culex pseudovishnui Colless, 1957 — Bangladesh, Cambodia, China, India, Indonesia, Iran, Japan, Korea, Laos, Malaysia, Nepal, Pakistan, Philippines, Singapore, Thailand, Vietnam
Culex pullatus Graham, 1910 — Mali, Nigeria
Culex punctipes Theobald, 1907
Culex pungens Wiedemann, 1828
Culex pygmaeus Neveu-Lemaire, 1906
Culex quasigelidus Theobald, 1903
Culex quasiguiarti Theobald, 1910 — Cameroon, Ethiopia, Kenya, Madagascar, Uganda, Zaire
Culex quasilinealis Theobald, 1907
Culex quasimodestus Theobald, 1905
Culex quasipipiens Theobald, 1901
Culex quasisecutor Theobald, 1907
Culex quinquefasciatus Say, 1823 — Argentina, Australia, Bahamas, Bangladesh, Brazil, Cambodia, Chile, China, Congo, Cuba, Djibouti, Dominican Republic, Ethiopia, India, Indonesia, Iran, Kiribati, Laos, Madagascar, Malaysia, Maldives, Marshall Islands, Mauritius, Mexico, Micronesia, Federated States of, Nauru, Nepal, New Zealand, Oman, Pakistan, Palau, Papua New Guinea, Peru, Philippines, Samoa, Saudi Arabia, Solomon Islands, South Africa, Sudan, Suriname, Tanzania, Tonga, Trinidad and Tobago, United Kingdom, United States, Uruguay, Vanuatu, Comoros, New Caledonia, Zaire, Equatorial Guinea, Myanmar, Tuvalu, Cook Islands, British Indian Ocean Territory (Chagos)
Culex quitensis Levi-Castillo, 1953 — Ecuador
Culex raymondii Tamayo,
Culex reesi Theobald, 1901
Culex reflector Dyar & Knab, 1909
Culex regulator Dyar & Knab, 1906
Culex renatoi Lane & Ramalho, 1960 — Brazil
Culex restuans Theobald, 1901 — Canada, Guatemala, Honduras, Mexico, United States
Culex revelator Dyar & Knab, 1907
Culex revocator Dyar & Knab, 1909
Culex richteri Ingram & De Meillon, 1927
Culex riojanus Duret, 1968 — Argentina
Culex ronaldi Charmoy,
Culex roseni Belkin, 1962 — French Polynesia
Culex rotoruae Belkin, 1968 — New Zealand
Culex rufinus Bigot, 1888
Culex rufus Meigen, 1818
Culex saibaii Taylor, 1912
Culex salinarius Coquillett, 1904 — Canada, Mexico, United States, Bermuda
Culex salinus Baisas, 1938
Culex saltanensis Dyar, 1928 — Argentina, Brazil, Panama, Venezuela
Culex salus Theobald, 1908
Culex samoaensis (Theobald, 1914)
Culex sarawaki Theobald, 1907
Culex scheuberi Carpintero & Leguizamon, 2004 — Argentina
Culex scholasticus Theobald, 1901
Culex schwetzi Edwards, 1929 — Liberia, Zaire
Culex scimitar Branch & Seabrook, 1959 — Bahamas
Culex scottii Theobald, 1912 — Seychelles
Culex scutatus Rozeboom & Komp, 1948
Culex secutor Theobald, 1901 — Jamaica, Puerto Rico, Lesser Antilles
Culex selangorensis Sirivanakarn, 1976 — Malaysia
Culex seldeslachtsi Wolfs, 1947 — Zaire
Culex sericeus Theobald, 1901
Culex serotinus Philippi, 1865
Culex shoae Hamon & Ovazza, 1954 — Ethiopia, Uganda
Culex siamensis Barraud & Christophers, 1931
Culex similis Theobald, 1903
Culex simplex Theobald, 1903
Culex simpsoni Theobald, 1905 — Djibouti, Kenya, Madagascar, Morocco, Seychelles, South Africa, Sudan, Tanzania, Yemen, Zimbabwe, Comoros, Zaire
Culex sinaiticus Kirkpatrick, 1924 — Egypt, Eritrea, Iran, Israel, Jordan, Oman, Saudi Arabia, Sudan, Yemen
Culex sitiens Wiedemann, 1828 — Australia, Bangladesh, Cameroon, China, Djibouti, Fiji, India, Indonesia, Iran, Japan, Kenya, Korea, Madagascar, Malaysia, Maldives, Morocco, Mozambique, Nauru, Oman, Pakistan, Papua New Guinea, Philippines, Samoa, Saudi Arabia, Singapore, Solomon Islands, Sri Lanka, Sudan, Taiwan, Tanzania, Thailand, Tonga, United Arab Emirates, Vanuatu, Yemen, Comoros, New Caledonia, Myanmar, Tuvalu
Culex skusii Giles, 1900
Culex solitarius Bonne-Wepster, 1938 — Indonesia
Culex somaliensis Neveu-Lemaire, 1906
Culex somerseti Taylor, 1912 — Australia
Culex sphinx Howard, Dyar, & Knab, 1912 — Bahamas, Cuba
Culex spinosus Lutz, 1905 — Brazil, Colombia, Venezuela
Culex squamosus (Taylor, 1914) — Australia, Indonesia, Solomon Islands
Culex starckeae Stone & Knight, 1958 — Australia, Indonesia, Vanuatu, New Caledonia
Culex stenolepis Dyar & Knab, 1908 — Costa Rica, Mexico
Culex sternopallidus Roubaud, 1945
Culex sternopunctatus Roubaud, 1945
Culex stigmatosoma Dyar, 1907 — United States
Culex stoehri Theobald, 1907
Culex striatipes Edwards, 1941 — Burkina Faso, Ethiopia, Kenya, Zambia, Zimbabwe, Zaire, South Africa
Culex summorosus Dyar, 1920
Culex surinamensis Dyar, 1918 — Bolivia, Brazil, Suriname, Venezuela, French Guiana
Culex taeniarostris Theobald, 1907
Culex taeniorhynchoides Giles, 1904
Culex tamsi Edwards, 1934 — Sao Tome & Principe
Culex tarsalis Coquillett, 1896 — Canada, Mexico, United States
Culex tatoi Casal & Garcia, 1971 — Argentina
Culex taylori Edwards, 1921
Culex taytayensis Banks, 1909
Culex tejerai Cova Garcia, 1962
Culex telesilla de Meillon & Lavoipierre, 1945 — Angola, Cameroon, Liberia, Mozambique, Zaire
Culex tenagius Van Someren, 1954 — Djibouti, Kenya, Uganda
Culex tenax Theobald, 1901
Culex terzii Edwards, 1941 — Ethiopia, Kenya, South Africa, Uganda, Zimbabwe
Culex thalassius Theobald, 1903 — Angola, Cameroon, Gabon, Gambia, Ghana, Kenya, Liberia, Madagascar, Mauritius, Mozambique, Senegal, South Africa, Syria, Tanzania, Togo, French Guiana, Zaire
Culex theileri Theobald, 1903 — Afghanistan, Algeria, Bangladesh, Bulgaria, China, Egypt, Greece, India, Iran, Iraq, Israel, Jordan, Kenya, Lebanon, Libya, Mongolia, Morocco, Nepal, Pakistan, Portugal, Romania, Russia, Saudi Arabia, Slovakia, South Africa, Spain, Syria, Tajikistan, Tanzania, Tunisia, Turkey, Zimbabwe
Culex thoracicus Robineau-Desvoidy, 1827
Culex thriambus Dyar, 1921 — Colombia, Costa Rica, Dominican Republic, Mexico, Panama, United States
Culex tianpingensis Chen, 1981 — China
Culex tipuliformis Theobald, 1901
Culex tisseuli Senevet, 1937
Culex tomeri Dyar & Knab, 1907
Culex toroensis Edwards & Gibbins, 1939 — Cameroon, Kenya, Malawi, South Africa, Sudan, Uganda, Zaire
Culex torrentium Martini, 1925 — Belgium, Czech Republic, Denmark, Finland, France, Germany, Iran, Luxembourg, Norway, Poland, Portugal, Romania, Russia, Slovakia, Spain, Sweden, Turkey, United Kingdom
Culex torridus Iglisch., 1977
Culex toviiensis Klein, Riviere & Sechan, 1983
Culex townsvillensis Taylor, 1919
Culex trifilatus Edwards, 1914 — Cameroon, Ethiopia, Gabon, Kenya, Malawi, Mozambique, South Africa, Sudan, Tanzania, Uganda, Zimbabwe, Zaire
Culex trifoliatus Edwards, 1914 — Ethiopia, Ghana, Kenya, Namibia, South Africa, Sudan, Uganda, Zaire
Culex trifurcatus Fabricius, 1794
Culex trilineatus Theobald, 1901
Culex tritaeniorhynchus Giles, 1901 — Angola, Bangladesh, Cambodia, Cameroon, Central African Republic, China, Djibouti, Egypt, Ethiopia, Gabon, Gambia, Ghana, Greece, India, Indonesia, Iran, Iraq, Israel, Japan, Jordan, Kenya, Korea, Lebanon, Malaysia, Maldives, Mozambique, Nepal, Nigeria, Pakistan, Philippines, Russia, Saudi Arabia, Sri Lanka, Syria, Tanzania, Thailand, Togo, Turkey, Turkmenistan, Vietnam, Myanmar
Culex tsengi Lien, 1968 — Taiwan
Culex umbripes Edwards, 1941 — Zaire
Culex unistriatus Curtis, 1837
Culex univittatus Theobald, 1901 — Bulgaria, Burkina Faso, Djibouti, Egypt, Ethiopia, Kenya, Madagascar, Niger, Pakistan, Portugal, South Africa, Spain, Yemen, Zimbabwe
Culex usquatissimus Dyar, 1922 — Colombia, Costa Rica, Ecuador, Guyana, Panama, Venezuela
Culex usquatus Dyar, 1918 — Argentina, Brazil, Mexico, Panama, Paraguay
Culex vagans Wiedemann, 1828 — Bangladesh, China, India, Iran, Japan, Korea, Mongolia, Nepal, Pakistan, Russia
Culex vansomereni Edwards, 1926 — Ethiopia, Kenya, Mozambique, Sudan, Tanzania, Uganda, Zimbabwe, Zaire, South Africa
Culex varioannulatus Theobald, 1903 — China, Japan, Korea, Mexico, United States
Culex ventrilloni Edwards, 1920 — Madagascar
Culex verutus Harbach, 1987 — Sierra Leone
Culex vicinus (Taylor, 1916) — Australia
Culex vindicator Dyar & Knab, 1909
Culex virgatipes Edwards, 1914
Culex viridis Theobald, 1903 — Ghana, Nigeria
Culex vishnui Theobald, 1901 — Bangladesh, Cambodia, China, India, Indonesia, Japan, Malaysia, Maldives, Nepal, Philippines, Singapore, Sri Lanka, Taiwan, Thailand, Vietnam, Myanmar, Timor
Culex watti Edwards, 1920 — Angola, Ghana, Tanzania, Uganda
Culex weschei Edwards, 1935 — Burkina Faso, Cameroon, Ghana, Mozambique, Senegal, Sudan, Togo, Zaire, Kenya
Culex whitei Barraud, 1923 — Bangladesh, India, Indonesia, Malaysia, Nepal, Philippines, Thailand, Vietnam
Culex whitmorei Giles, 1904 — Australia, Bangladesh, China, India, Indonesia, Japan, Korea, Malaysia, Nepal, Pakistan, Philippines, Russia, Sri Lanka, Taiwan, Vietnam
Culex whittingtoni Belkin, 1962 — Solomon Islands
Culex willistoni Giles, 1900
Culex yojoae Strickman, 1990 — Belize, Honduras
Culex zeltneri Neveu-Lemaire, 1906
Culex zombaensis Theobald, 1901 — Angola, Ethiopia, Kenya, Malawi, Mozambique, Sudan, Tanzania, Uganda, Zambia, Zaire

Subgenus Culiciomyia Theobald
Culex azurini Toma, Miyagi & Cabrera, 1984 — Philippines
Culex bahri (Edwards, 1914) — Indonesia, Sri Lanka
Culex bailyi Barraud, 1934 — India, Indonesia, Sri Lanka, Thailand
Culex barrinus Bram — Thailand
Culex cambournaci Hamon & Gandara, 1955 — Sao Tome & Principe
Culex ceramensis Sirivanakarn & Kurihara, 1973 — Indonesia
Culex cheni Dong, Wang & Lu, 2003 — China
Culex cinerellus Edwards, 1922 — Angola, Cameroon, Central African Republic, Congo, Kenya, Liberia, Madagascar, Nigeria, Sierra Leone, South Africa, Sudan, Uganda, Comoros, Zaire
Culex cinereus Theobald, 1901 — Angola, Burkina Faso, Cameroon, Ghana, Kenya, Liberia, Madagascar, Nigeria, Sierra Leone, South Africa, Sudan, Uganda, Zambia, Zimbabwe, Zaire
Culex freetownensis Theobald, 1901
Culex uniformis Theobald, 1909
Culex delfinadoae Sirivanakarn, 1973 — Philippines
Culex dispectus Bram, — Thailand
Culex eouzani Geoffroy, 1971 — Cameroon, Central African Republic
Culex fragilis Ludlow, 1903 — India, Indonesia, Malaysia, Philippines, Solomon Islands, Sri Lanka, Thailand
Culex ceylonica Theobald, 1907
Culex fuscus Theobald, 1905
Culex graminis Leicester, 1908
Culex inornata Theobald, 1907
Culex furlongi Van Someren, 1954 — Kenya
Culex fuscicinctus King & Hoogstraal, 1946 — Indonesia
Culex gilliesi Hamon & Van Someren, 1961 — Tanzania
Culex grenieri Eouzan, 1969 — Cameroon
Culex hainanensis Chen, 1977 — China
Culex harleyi Peters, 1955 — Cameroon, Liberia
Culex harrisoni Sirivanakarn, 1977 — Thailand
Culex javanensis Bonne-Wepster, 1934 — Indonesia
Culex kyotoensis Yamaguti & LaCasse, 1952 — Japan, Korea
Culex lampangensis Sirivanakarn, 1973 — Thailand
Culex liberiensis Peters, 1955 — Liberia, Zaire
Culex macfiei Edwards, 1923 — Burkina Faso, Cameroon, Central African Republic, Gabon, Ghana, Liberia, Nigeria, Senegal, Sierra Leone, Sudan, Uganda, Zaire
Culex maplei Knight & Hurlbut, 1949 — Micronesia, Federated States of
Culex megaonychus Yang & Li, 1993 — China
Culex milloti Doucet, 1949 — Madagascar
Culex mongiro Van Someren, 1951 — Uganda
Culex muspratti Hamon & Lambrecht, 1959 — Zaire
Culex nailoni King & Hoogstraal, 1946 — Indonesia
Culex nebulosus Theobald, 1901 — Ghana, Nigeria, Sierra Leone, Comoros, Ethiopian & Oriental Regions
Culex freetownensis Theobald, 1901
Culex fuscus Theobald, 1909
Culex invenustus Theobald, 1901
Culex nigrochaetae Theobald, 1901 — Lesotho, Malawi, Namibia, Nigeria, South Africa, Tanzania, Zimbabwe, Zaire
Culex nigropunctatus Edwards, 1926 — Bangladesh, China, India, Indonesia, Japan, Malaysia, Micronesia, Federated States of, Nepal, Palau, Philippines, Singapore, Sri Lanka, Taiwan, Thailand, Hong Kong
Culex annulata Theobald, 1907
Culex pallidothorax Theobald, 1905 — Bangladesh, China, India, Indonesia, Japan, Malaysia, Myanmar (Burma, Nepal, Philippines, Sri Lanka, Taiwan, Thailand, Vietnam, Timor
Culex albopleura Theobald, 1907
Culex annuloabdominalis Theobald, 1910
Culex pandani Brunhes, 1969 — Madagascar
Culex papuensis (Taylor, 1914) — Indonesia, Malaysia, Papua New Guinea, Philippines, Solomon Islands, Thailand
Culex pullus Theobald, 1905 — Australia, Bangladesh, Indonesia, Papua New Guinea, Solomon Islands, Timor
Culex muticus Edwards, 1923
Culex rajah Tsukamoto, 1989 — Malaysia
Culex ramakrishnii Wattal & Kalra, 1965 — India
Culex ramalingami Sirivanakarn, 1973 — Malaysia
Culex ruthae Peters, 1958 — Papua New Guinea
Culex ryukyensis Bohart, 1946 — Japan
Culex sasai Kano, Nitahara, & Awaya, 1954 — Japan, Korea
Culex scanloni Bram, — Indonesia, Malaysia, Philippines, Thailand
Culex semibrunneus Edwards, 1927 — Cameroon, Congo, Kenya, Uganda, Zaire
Culex shebbearei Barraud, 1924 — China, India
Culex spathifurca (Edwards, 1915) — India, Indonesia, Malaysia, Maldives, Philippines, Singapore, Sri Lanka, Thailand
Culex stylifurcatus Carter & Wijesundara, 1948
Culex spiculostylus Chen, 1989 — China
Culex spiculothorax Bram, — Malaysia, Thailand
Culex subaequalis Edwards, 1941 — Cameroon, Côte d'Ivoire, Gabon, Kenya, Uganda, Zaire
Culex termi Thurman, 1955 — Thailand
Culex thurmanorum Bram, 1967 — Thailand
Culex tricuspis Edwards, 1930 — Indonesia
Culex trifidus Edwards, 1926
Culex viridiventer Giles, 1901 — Bangladesh, China, India, Nepal, Pakistan, Vietnam
Culex angulatus Theobald, 1901
Culex longifurcatus Theobald, 1910
Culex pseudolongifurcatus Theobald, 1910
Culex yaoi Tung, 1955 — China

Subgenus Eumelanomyia Theobald
Culex acrostichalis Edwards, 1941 — Uganda, Zaire
Culex adami (Hamon & Mouchet, 1955) — Cameroon
Culex adersianus Edwards, 1941 — Côte d'Ivoire, Kenya, Tanzania
Culex albertianus Edwards, 1941 — Kenya, Zaire
Culex albiventris Edwards, 1922 — Cambodia, Central African Republic, Congo, Ghana, Kenya, Liberia, Sierra Leone, Uganda
Culex inconspicuosa Theobald, 1909
Culex amaniensis Van Someren & Hamon, 1964 — Tanzania
Culex andreanus Edwards, 1927 — Congo, Ghana, Nigeria, Uganda, Zaire
Culex baisasi Sirivanakarn, 1972 — Philippines
Culex bokorensis Klein & Sirivanakarn, 1969 — Cambodia
Culex brenguesi Brunhes & Ravaonjanahary, 1973 — Madagascar
Culex brevipalpis (Giles, 1902) — Bangladesh, Cambodia, China, India, Indonesia, Malaysia, Nepal, Papua New Guinea, Philippines, Singapore, Sri Lanka, Taiwan, Thailand, Vietnam
Culex fidelis Dyar, 1920
Culex longipes Theobald, 1901
Culex macropus Blanchard, 1905
Culex uniformis Leicester, 1908
Culex calabarensis Edwards, 1941 — Nigeria
Culex campilunati Carter & Wijesundara, 1948 — Sri Lanka
Culex castor de Meillon & Lavoipierre, 1944 — Zaire
Culex castrensis Edwards, 1922 — India, Sri Lanka
Culex nigrescens Theobald, 1907
Culex cataractarum Edwards, 1923 — Papua New Guinea, Philippines
Culex tricontus Delfinado, 1966
Culex chauveti Brunhes & Rambelo, 1968 — Madagascar, Comoros
Culex femineus Edwards, 1926 — Vanuatu
Culex fimbriforceps Edwards, 1935 — Cameroon, Uganda, Zaire
Culex foliatus Brug, 1932 — China, India, Indonesia, Malaysia, Nepal, Philippines, Sri Lanka, Taiwan, Thailand, Vietnam
Culex chiyutoi Baisas, 1935
Culex chungkiangensis Chang & Chang., 1974
Culex shrivastavii Wattal, Kalra, & Krishnan, 1966
Culex galliardi Edwards, 1941 — Gabon, Gambia, Liberia, Nigeria, Sierra Leone, Zaire
Culex garioui Bailly-Choumara & Rickenbach, 1966 — Cameroon
Culex germaini Geoffroy, 1974 — Central African Republic
Culex gudouensis Chang, Zhao, Hang & Chen, 1975 — China
Culex hackeri Edwards, 1923 — Malaysia
Culex hamoni Brunhes, Adam, & Bailly-Choumara, 1967 — Congo
Culex hayashii Yamada, 1917 — China, Japan, Korea, Russia, Taiwan
Culex helenae Brunhes Adam, & Bailly-Choumara, 1967 — Cameroon
Culex hinglungensis Chu, 1957 — Cambodia, China, Philippines, Thailand
Culex culionicus Delfinado, 1966
Culex horridus Edwards, 1922 — Angola, Cameroon, Central African Republic, Congo, Ghana, Kenya, Liberia, Madagascar, Mozambique, Nigeria, South Africa, Sudan, Zambia, Zimbabwe, Comoros, Zaire
Culex fusca Theobald, 1909 — Burkina Faso, Cameroon
Culex inconspicuosus (Theobald, 1908) — Angola, Burkina Faso, Cameroon, Central African Republic, Congo, Gabon, Gambia, Ghana, Kenya, Liberia, Mali, Mozambique, Nigeria, South Africa, Sudan, Zambia, Zimbabwe, Zaire
Culex insignis (Carter, 1911) — Burkina Faso, Cameroon, Congo, Ghana, Kenya, Madagascar, Malawi, Mauritius, Mozambique, Sierra Leone, Sudan, Uganda, Zaire
Culex iphis Barraud, 1924 — India
Culex jefferyi Sirivanakarn, 1977 — Malaysia
Culex kanyamwerima Van Someren, 1951 — Uganda
Culex khazani Edwards, 1922 — India
Culex kilara Van Someren, 1951 — Uganda
Culex kingianus Edwards, 1922 — Cameroon, Central African Republic, Côte d'Ivoire, Madagascar, Nigeria, Sudan, Uganda, Zaire
Culex kiriensis Klein & Sirivanakarn, 1969 — Cambodia, Thailand
Culex laplantei Hamon, Adam, & Mouchet, 1955 — Cameroon
Culex latifoliatus Delfinado, 1966 — Philippines
Culex laureli Baisas, 1935 — Philippines
Culex macrostylus Sirivanakrn & Ramalingam, 1976 — Malaysia
Culex malayensis Sirivanakarn, 1972 — Malaysia
Culex malayi (Leicester, 1908) — Bangladesh, China, India, Indonesia, Malaysia, Maldives, Myanmar (Burma, Nepal, Pakistan, Sri Lanka, Taiwan, Thailand, Vietnam)
Culex aedes Leicester, 1908
Culex nigrescens Theobald, 1907
Culex manusensis Sirivnakarn, 1975 — Papua New Guinea
Culex megafolius Chen & Dong, 1992 — China
Culex miaolingensis Chen, 1982 — China
Culex mijanae Brunhes, Adam, & Bailly-Choumara, 1967 — Cameroon
Culex mohani Sirivanakarn, 1977 — India
Culex mundulus Gruenberg, 1905 — Nigeria
Culex nyangae Galliard, 1931 — Gabon
Culex okinawae Bohart, 1953 — Japan, Philippines, Taiwan
Culex lini Lien, 1968
Culex oresbius Harbach & Rattanarithikul, 1988 — Thailand
Culex orstom Brunhes, Adam, & Bailly-Choumara, 1967 — Congo
Culex otachati Klein & Sirivanakarn, 1969 — Cambodia, Thailand
Culex phangngae Sirivanakarn, 1972 — Thailand
Culex pluvialis Barraud, 1924 — India, Malaysia, Sri Lanka
Culex pseudoandreanus Bailly-Choumara, 1965 — Cameroon
Culex quintetti Brunhes, Adam, & Bailly-Choumara, 1967 — Angola, Côte d'Ivoire
Culex richardgarciai Jeffery, Oothuman & Rudnick, 1987 — Malaysia
Culex richei Klein, 1970 — Cambodia
Culex rima Theobald, 1901 — Burkina Faso, Cameroon, Central African Republic, Gabon, Liberia, Mozambique, Nigeria, Sierra Leone, South Africa, Zaire
Culex koumbai Galliard, 1931
Culex rubinotus Theobald, 1906 — Angola, Cameroon, Central African Republic, Congo, Ethiopia, Gabon, Kenya, Mozambique, Senegal, South Africa, Sudan, Tanzania, Uganda, Zambia, Zaire
Culex selai Klein & Sirivanakarn, 1969 — Cambodia, Malaysia
Culex simplicicornis Edwards, 1930 — Malaysia
Culex simpliciforceps Edwards, 1941 — Cameroon, Congo, Côte d'Ivoire, Sudan, Uganda, Zaire
Culex stellatus Van Someren, 1947 — Seychelles
Culex subrima Edwards, 1941 — Cameroon, Congo, Liberia, Nigeria, Zaire
Culex sunyaniensis Edwards, 1941 — Cameroon, Gabon, Gambia, Ghana, Liberia, Mozambique, Nigeria, Senegal, Sierra Leone, Sudan
Culex tauffliebi Geoffroy & Herve, 1976 — Central African Republic
Culex tenuipalpis Barraud, 1924 — India, Indonesia, Malaysia, Thailand
Culex uncinatus Delfinado, 1966 — Philippines
Culex vattieri Geoffroy, 1971 — Central African Republic
Culex vinckei Hamon, Holstein, & Rivola, 1957 — Côte d'Ivoire, Zaire
Culex wansoni Wolfs, 1945 — Zaire
Culex wigglesworthi Edwards, 1941 — Burkina Faso, Cameroon, Ghana, Kenya, Nigeria, Sierra Leone, Sudan, Uganda, Comoros, Zaire
Culex yeageri Baisas, 1935 — Philippines

Subgenus Kitzmilleria Danilov
Culex moucheti Evans, 1923 — Cameroon, Kenya, Liberia, Nigeria, Sudan, Uganda, Zaire

Subgenus Lasiosiphon KirkPatrick
Culex adairi Kirkpatrick, 1926 — Egypt, Israel, French Equatorial Africa
Culex kirkpatricki Stackelberg, 1927
Culex kirkpatriki Edwards, 1926
Culex pluvialis Kirkpatrick, 1924

Subgenus Lophoceraomyia Theobald
Culex aculeatus Colless, 1965 — Malaysia, Thailand
Culex acutipalus Colless, 1965 — Malaysia, Singapore
Culex aestivus Sirivanakarn, 1977 — Malaysia
Culex alorensis Sirivanakarn, 1977 — Indonesia, Timor
Culex alphus Colless, 1965 — Malaysia, Singapore, Thailand
Culex atracus Colless, 1960 — Solomon Islands
Culex franclemonti Belkin, 1962
Culex bandoengensis Brug, 1939 — Indonesia, Malaysia
Culex becki Belkin, 1962 — Solomon Islands
Culex bengalensis Barraud, 1934 — China, India, Indonesia, Malaysia, Thailand
Culex bergi Belkin, 1962 — Solomon Islands
Culex bicornutus Theobald, — China, India, Japan, Malaysia, Myanmar (Burma, Sri Lanka, Thailand, Vietnam)
Culex bolii Sirivanakarn, 1968 — Papua New Guinea
Culex brevipalpus (Theobald, 1905) — Malaysia, Singapore
Culex buxtoni Edwards, 1926 — Vanuatu
Culex carolinensis Bohart & Ingram, 1946 — Micronesia, Federated States of
Culex castaneus Sirivanakarn, 1973 — Papua New Guinea
Culex christiani Colless, 1960 — Indonesia
Culex cinctellus Edwards, 1922 — China, India, Indonesia, Japan, Malaysia, Philippines, Singapore, Thailand, Vietnam
Culex taeniata Leicester, 1908
Culex coerulescens Edwards, 1928 — Malaysia, Singapore
Culex collessi Sirivanakarn, 1968 — Papua New Guinea
Culex cottlei Sirivanakarn, 1968 — Papua New Guinea
Culex crassicomus Colless, 1965 — Malaysia
Culex crowei Sirivanakarn, 1968 — Papua New Guinea
Culex cubiculi Marks, — Australia
Culex annulata Taylor, 1916
Culex cubitatus Colless, 1965 — Indonesia, Malaysia, Philippines, Singapore
Culex curtipalpis (Edwards, 1914) — Indonesia, Malaysia, Singapore, Thailand
Culex cylindricus Theobald, 1903 — Australia, Papua New Guinea
Culex demissus Colless, 1965 — Malaysia, Thailand
Culex fuscosiphonis Bram & Rattanarithikul, 1967
Culex digoelensis Brug, 1932 — Indonesia
Culex caeruleus King & Hoogstraal, 1947
Culex durhami Sirivanakarn, 1968 — Papua New Guinea
Culex eminentia (Leicester, 1908) — Malaysia, Singapore
Culex eukrines Bram & Rattanarithikul, 1967 — Thailand
Culex flavicornis Barraud, 1924 — India
Culex fraudatrix (Theobald, 1905) — Australia, Indonesia
Culex fulleri (Ludlow, 1909) — Philippines
Culex gagnei Evenhuis, 1989 — Indonesia, Papua New Guinea
Culex ornatus (Theobald, 1905)
Culex ganapathi Colless, 1965 — Malaysia, Thailand
Culex gibbulus Delfinado, 1966 — Philippines
Culex gossi Bohart, 1956 — Micronesia, Federated States of
Culex gracicornis Sirivanakarn, 1977 — Malaysia, Thailand
Culex gressitti Sirivanakarn, 1968 — Papua New Guinea
Culex harpagophallus Wang & Feng, 1964 — China
Culex hewitti (Edwards, 1914) — Indonesia, Malaysia, Singapore
Culex hilli Edwards, 1922 — Australia
Culex australis Taylor, 1915
Culex hirtipalpis Sirivanakarn, 1977 — Thailand
Culex hurlbuti Belkin, 1962 — Papua New Guinea, Solomon Islands
Culex imposter Sirivanakarn, 1977 — Malaysia
Culex incomptus Bram & Rattanarithikul, 1967 — Thailand
Culex inculus Colless, 1965 — Cambodia, Indonesia, Malaysia
Culex infantulus Edwards, 1922 — China, India, Indonesia, Japan, Korea, Malaysia, Maldives, Myanmar (Burma, Nepal, Philippines, Sri Lanka, Thailand, Vietnam)
Culex parainfantulus Menon, 1944
Culex insequens Marks, 1989 — Australia
Culex cairnsensis Taylor, 1919
Culex insularis Sirivanakarn, 1968 — Papua New Guinea
Culex jenseni (De Meijere, 1910) — China, India, Indonesia, Japan, Malaysia, Maldives, Myanmar (Burma, Nepal, Philippines, Sri Lanka, Thailand, Vietnam)
Culex josephineae Baisas, 1935 — Philippines
Culex kaviengensis Sirivanakarn, 1968 — Papua New Guinea
Culex kowiroensis Sirivanakarn, 1968 — Papua New Guinea
Culex kuhnsi King & Hoogstraal, 1955 — Indonesia, Malaysia, Philippines
Culex mercedesae Baisas, 1974
Culex kusaiensis Bohart, 1956 — Micronesia, Federated States of
Culex laffooni Belkin, 1962 — Solomon Islands
Culex lairdi Belkin, 1962 — Solomon Islands
Culex lakei Sirivanakarn, 1968 — Papua New Guinea
Culex lasiopalpis Sirivanakarn, 1977 — Sri Lanka
Culex lavatae Stone & Bohart, 1944 — Malaysia, Philippines
Culex leei King & Hoogstraal, 1955 — Indonesia
Culex lucaris Colless, 1965 — Malaysia, Singapore, Thailand
Culex macdonaldi Colless, 1965 — India, Indonesia, Malaysia, Philippines, Singapore, Thailand, Vietnam
Culex mammilifer (Leicester, 1908) — China, India, Indonesia, Malaysia, Philippines, Sri Lanka, Thailand
Culex chiungchungensis Hsu, 1963
Culex marksae King & Hoogstraal, 1955 — Indonesia
Culex minjensis Sirivanakarn, 1968 — Papua New Guinea
Culex minor (Leicester, 1908) — China, India, Indonesia, Malaysia, Philippines, Thailand
Culex nolledoi Baisas, 1935
Culex plantaginis Barraud., 1924
Culex minutissimus (Theobald, 1907) — Bangladesh, India, Indonesia, Malaysia, Maldives, Pakistan, Sri Lanka, Thailand
Culex juxtapallidiceps Theobald, 1910
Culex nigerrima Theobald, 1910
Culex muruae Sirivanakarn, 1968 — Papua New Guinea
Culex navalis Edwards, 1926 — Indonesia, Malaysia, Singapore
Culex niger (Leicester, 1908) — Malaysia
Culex atratulus Edwards, 1922
Culex orbostiensis Dobrotworsky, 1957 — Australia
Culex oweni Belkin, 1962 — Solomon Islands
Culex pairoji Sirivanakarn, 1977 — Indonesia, Malaysia, Singapore, Thailand
Culex paraculeatus Sirivanakarn, 1977 — Malaysia, Philippines
Culex perryi Belkin, 1962 — Solomon Islands
Culex petersi Colless, 1960 — Indonesia, Papua New Guinea
Culex peytoni Bram & Rattanarithikul, 1967 — India, Indonesia, Malaysia, Thailand, Vietnam
Culex pholeter Bram & Rattanarithikul, 1967 — Thailand
Culex pilifemoralis Wang & Feng, 1964 — China, Thailand
Culex pseudornatus Colless, 1960 — Papua New Guinea
Culex pseudorubithoracis Sirivanakarn, 1968 — Papua New Guinea
Culex quadripalpis (Edwards, 1914) — India, Indonesia, Malaysia, Philippines, Singapore, Sri Lanka, Thailand, Vietnam
Culex pachecoi Baisas., 1935
Culex roubaudi Borel, 1926
Culex sylvestris Leicester, 1908
Culex raghavanii Rahman, Chowdhury, & Kalra, 1968 — India
Culex rajaneeae Sirivanakarn, 1968 — Papua New Guinea
Culex reidi Colless, 1965 — Indonesia, Malaysia, Philippines, Singapore, Thailand
Culex rubithoracis (Leicester, 1908) — Cambodia, China, India, Indonesia, Japan, Malaysia, Philippines, Singapore, Sri Lanka, Taiwan, Thailand, Vietnam
Culex sangenluoensis Wang, 1984 — China
Culex schilfgaardei Sirivanakarn, 1968 — Papua New Guinea
Culex sedlacekae Sirivanakarn, 1968 — Papua New Guinea
Culex seniori Barraud, 1934 — India
Culex shanahani Sirivanakarn, 1968 — Indonesia, Papua New Guinea
Culex singuawaensis Sirivanakarn, 1969 — Papua New Guinea
Culex confusus Sirivanakarn, 1968
Culex solomonis Edwards, 1929 — Solomon Islands
Culex spiculosus Bram & Rattanarithikul, 1967 — Indonesia, Malaysia, Myanmar (Burma, Taiwan, Thailand)
Culex hui Lien, 1968
Culex steffani Sirivanakarn, 1968 — Papua New Guinea
Culex submarginalis Sirivanakarn, 1973 — Papua New Guinea
Culex sumatranus Brug, 1931 — Cambodia, China, Indonesia, Vietnam
Culex szemaoensis Wang & Feng, 1964 — China
Culex traubi Colless, 1965 — Indonesia, Malaysia, Thailand
Culex tuberis Bohart, 1946 — Japan
Culex uniformis (Theobald, 1905) — India, Philippines, Sri Lanka
Culex variatus (Leicester, 1908) — China, India, Indonesia, Malaysia, Singapore, Thailand, Vietnam
Culex versabilis Sirivanakarn, 1968 — Papua New Guinea
Culex walukasi Belkin, 1962 — Solomon Islands
Culex wamanguae Sirivanakarn, 1968 — Papua New Guinea
Culex wardi Sirivanakarn, 1977 — Sri Lanka
Culex whartoni Colless, 1965 — Indonesia, Malaysia, Singapore, Thailand
Culex wilfredi Colless, 1965 — Malaysia, Thailand, Vietnam
Culex winkleri Belkin, 1962 — Solomon Islands

Subgenus Maillotia Theobald
Culex amboannulatus Theobald, 1913
Culex arbieeni Salem, 1938 — Algeria, Egypt, Iran, Sudan, Yemen, French Equatorial Africa
Culex avianus de Meillon, 1943 — South Africa
Culex bostocki Theobald, 1905
Culex deserticola Kirkpatrick, 1924 — Algeria, Egypt, Iran, Israel, Jordan, Morocco, Spain, Syria, Tunisia, Turkey, French Equatorial Africa
Culex hortensis Ficalbi, 1889 — Bulgaria, Czech Republic, Greece, India, Iran, Iraq, Italy, Morocco, Portugal, Romania, Russia, Slovakia, Spain, Tajikistan, Turkey
Culex jenkinsi Knight, 1953
Culex lavieri Larrousse, 1925
Culex naudeanus Muspratt., 1961 — South Africa
Culex peringueyi Edwards, 1924 — South Africa
Culex pilifera Theobald, 1907 — Portugal
Culex quettensis Mattingly, 1955 — Pakistan
Culex robici Doucet, 1950
Culex salisburiensis Theobald, 1901 — Kenya, Lesotho, Madagascar, South Africa, Sudan, Uganda, Yemen, Zambia, Zimbabwe, Zaire
Culex seyrigi Edwards, 1941 — Madagascar
Culex subsalisburiensis Herve & Geoffroy, 1974 — Central African Republic

Subgenus Melanoconion Theobald

Culex abominator Dyar & Knab, 1909 — United States
Culex abonnenci Clastrier, 1970 — French Guiana
Culex adamesi Sirivanakarn & Galindo, 1980 — Brazil, Colombia, Ecuador, Panama, French Guiana
Culex advieri Senevet, 1938
Culex agitator Dyar & Knab,
Culex albinensis Bonne-Wepster & Bonne, 1919 — Argentina, Brazil, Colombia, Panama, Paraguay, Suriname, Venezuela, French Guiana
Culex alcocki Bonne-Wepster & Bonne, 1919 — Suriname, French Guiana
Culex alfaroi Dyar, 1921
Culex aliciae Duret, 1953 — Argentina, Bolivia, Brazil, Paraguay
Culex alinkios Sallum & Hutchings, 2003 — Brazil
Culex alogistus Dyar, 1918 — Brazil, Colombia, Costa Rica, Panama, Suriname, Venezuela, French Guiana
Culex alvarezi Sutil Oramas, Pulido Florenzano & Amarista Meneses, 1987 — Venezuela
Culex amitis Komp, 1936 — Venezuela
Culex andricus Root, 1927 — Brazil
Culex aneles Dyar & Ludlow, 1922
Culex anips Dyar, 1916 — Mexico, United States
Culex anoplicitus Forattini & Sallum, 1989 — Brazil
Culex apeteticus Howard, Dyar, & Knab, 1912
Culex arboricola Galindo & Mendez, 1961 — Panama
Culex atratus Theobald, 1901 — Bahamas, Barbados, Brazil, Cuba, Dominican Republic, Guyana, Haiti, Jamaica, Panama, Saint Lucia, Suriname, Trinidad and Tobago, United States, Puerto Rico, Cayman Islands, Virgin Islands, Guadeloupe, Montserrat, Dominica, Martinique
Culex aureonotatus Duret & Barreto, 1956 — Brazil
Culex aurilatus Senevet & Abonnenc, 1939
Culex bahiensis Duret, 1969 — Brazil
Culex bastagarius Dyar & Knab, 1906 — Argentina, Brazil, Colombia, Costa Rica, Ecuador, El Salvador, Guatemala, Mexico, Nicaragua, Panama, Paraguay, Peru, Suriname, Trinidad and Tobago, Venezuela, French Guiana, Guadeloupe
Culex batesi Rozeboom & Komp, 1948 — Colombia, Costa Rica, Ecuador, French Guiana
Culex bejaranoi Duret, 1953 — Argentina
Culex bequaerti Dyar & Shannon, 1925 — Brazil
Culex bibulus Dyar, 1920
Culex bifoliatus Duret & Baretto, 1956 — Brazil
Culex bilobatus Galindo & Blanton, 1954
Culex bonneti Senevet, 1938
Culex borinqueni Root, 1922
Culex carcinophilus Dyar & Knab, 1906 — Cuba, Dominican Republic, Guatemala, Haiti, Puerto Rico
Culex caribeanus Galindo & Blanton, 1954 — Brazil, Panama
Culex caudatus Clastrier, 1970 — Brazil, French Guiana
Culex caudelli (Dyar & Knab, 1906) — Brazil, Colombia, Guyana, Panama, Peru, Suriname, Trinidad and Tobago, Venezuela, French Guiana
Culex cavernicola Floch & Abonnenc, 1945
Culex cayennensis Floch & Abonnenc, 1945
Culex cedecei Stone & Hair, 1968 — United States
Culex cenus Root, 1927
Culex changuinolae Galindo & Blanton, 1954 — Panama
Culex chrysonotum Dyar & Knab, 1908
Culex clarki Evans, 1924 — Argentina, Brazil, Paraguay, Uruguay, Venezuela
Culex colombiensis Dyar, 1924
Culex columnaris Sá & Hutchings, 2020 — Brazil
Culex comatus Senevet & Abonnenc, 1939 — Brazil, Colombia, French Guiana
Culex commevynensis Bonne-Wepster & Bonne, 1919 — Belize, Colombia, Panama, Suriname, French Guiana
Culex comminutor Dyar, 1920 — Brazil, Colombia, Ecuador, Suriname, Trinidad and Tobago, French Guiana
Culex confundior Komp & Rozeboom, 1951 — Suriname
Culex conspirator Dyar & Knab, 1906 — Belize, Colombia, Costa Rica, Ecuador, El Salvador, Guatemala, Honduras, Mexico, Nicaragua, Panama, Trinidad and Tobago, Venezuela
Culex contei Duret, 1968 — Brazil, Panama, Trinidad and Tobago, French Guiana
Culex coppenamensis Bonne-Wepster & Bonne, 1919 — Colombia, Suriname, Venezuela, French Guiana
Culex corentynensis Dyar, 1920 — Suriname, French Guiana
Culex creole Anduze, 1948 — Brazil, Colombia, Venezuela, French Guiana
Culex cristovaoi Duret, 1968 — Brazil, French Guiana
Culex crybda Dyar, 1924 — Brazil, Colombia, Panama, Trinidad and Tobago, Venezuela
Culex cubensis Dyar & Knab, 1906
Culex cuclyx Dyar & Shannon, 1924
Culex curopinensis Bonne-Wepster & Bonne, 1919
Culex curryi Dyar, 1926
Culex deceptor Dyar & Knab, 1909
Culex degustator Dyar, 1921
Culex delpontei Duret, 1969 — Argentina, Brazil, Paraguay
Culex diamphidius Peyton & Harbach, 1991 — Mexico
Culex distinguendus Dyar, 1928 — Brazil, Colombia, Costa Rica, Ecuador, Panama, Peru, French Guiana
Culex dolichophyllus Clastrier, 1970 — French Guiana
Culex dornarum Dyar & Shannon, 1924
Culex dunni Dyar, 1918 — Belize, Brazil, Colombia, Costa Rica, Ecuador, Mexico, Nicaragua, Panama, Paraguay, Suriname, Trinidad and Tobago, Venezuela, French Guiana
Culex dureti Casal & Garcia, 1968 — Argentina, Brazil, Paraguay, Venezuela
Culex dyius Root, 1927 — Brazil, French Guiana
Culex dysmathes Dyar & Ludlow, 1921
Culex eastor Dyar, 1920 — Brazil, Colombia, Ecuador, Guatemala, Mexico, Panama, Peru, Suriname, Trinidad and Tobago, French Guiana
Culex educator Dyar & Knab, — Argentina, Belize, Bolivia, Brazil, Colombia, Costa Rica, Ecuador, El Salvador, Guatemala, Honduras, Mexico, Nicaragua, Panama, Peru, Suriname, Venezuela, French Guiana
Culex egberti Dyar & Knab, 1907
Culex egcymon Dyar, 1923 — Colombia, Costa Rica, Panama
Culex eknomios Foratini & Sallum, 1992 — Brazil, Ecuador
Culex elephas Komp, 1936 — Panama, Venezuela
Culex elevator Dyar & Knab, 1906 — Argentina, Belize, Brazil, Colombia, Costa Rica, Ecuador, El Salvador, Guatemala, Honduras, Mexico, Nicaragua, Panama, United States, Venezuela, Puerto Rico, French Guiana, Guadeloupe, Dominica
Culex ensiformis Bonne-Wepster & Bonne, 1919 — Belize, Bolivia, Suriname, French Guiana
Culex epanatasis Dyar, 1922 — Nicaragua, Panama, French Guiana
Culex equinoxialis Floch & Abonnenc, 1945 — French Guiana
Culex ernanii Duret, 1968 — Brazil
Culex ernsti Anduze, 1948 — Venezuela
Culex erraticus (Dyar & Knab, 1906) — Belize, Brazil, Colombia, Costa Rica, Cuba, Dominican Republic, Ecuador, El Salvador, Guatemala, Guyana, Haiti, Honduras, Jamaica, Mexico, Nicaragua, Panama, Paraguay, Peru, Suriname, Trinidad and Tobago, United States, Venezuela, Puerto Rico, French Guiana, Virgin Islands, Netherlands Antilles
Culex evansae Root, 1927 — Brazil, Ecuador, Panama, Trinidad and Tobago, French Guiana
Culex exedrus Root, 1927
Culex fairchildi Galindo & Blanton, 1954 — Panama, Venezuela
Culex falsificator Dyar & Knab, 1909
Culex fatuator Dyar & Shannon, 1924
Culex faurani Duret, 1968 — Brazil, French Guiana
Culex ferreri Duret, 1968 — Colombia, Venezuela
Culex flabellifer Komp, 1936 — Belize, Guatemala, Honduras, Mexico, Panama, Venezuela, French Guiana
Culex floridanus Dyar & Knab, 1906
Culex foliafer Komp & Rozeboom, 1951 — Panama, Suriname, French Guiana
Culex fur Dyar & Knab, 1907
Culex galindoi Komp & Rozeboom, 1951 — Panama
Culex galvaoi Duret, 1968 — Brazil
Culex garcesi Duret, 1968 — Colombia, Costa Rica
Culex glyptosalpinx Harbach, Peyton & Harrison, 1984 — Argentina, Bolivia, Brazil, Paraguay
Culex gnomatos Sallum, Hutchings, Leila & Ferreira, 1997 — Brazil, Peru
Culex gordoni Evans, 1924
Culex guedesi da Silva Mattos & Xavier, 1991 — Brazil
Culex haynei Komp & Curry, 1932
Culex herrerai Sutil Oramas, Pulido Florenzano & Amarista Meneses, 1987 — Venezuela
Culex hesitator Dyar & Knab, 1907
Culex holoneus Dyar, 1921
Culex homoepas Dyar & Ludlow, 1921
Culex idottus Dyar, 1920 — Argentina, Bolivia, Brazil, Grenada, Paraguay, Saint Lucia, Suriname, Trinidad and Tobago, Venezuela, French Guiana, Guadeloupe, Dominica, Martinique
Culex ignobilis Dyar & Knab, 1909
Culex implicatus Senevet & Abonnenc, 1939
Culex inadmirabilis Dyar, 1928 — Brazil, French Guiana
Culex incriminator Dyar & Knab, 1909
Culex indecorabilis (Theobald, 1903) — Brazil
Culex inducens Root, 1928
Culex inhibitator Dyar & Knab, 1906 — Colombia, Costa Rica, Dominican Republic, El Salvador, Guatemala, Jamaica, Mexico, Panama, Suriname, Venezuela, Puerto Rico, French Guiana
Culex innominatus Evans, 1924
Culex innovator Evans, 1924 — Brazil, French Guiana
Culex intonsus Galindo & Blanton, 1954 — Honduras
Culex intrincatus Brethes, 1916 — Argentina, Brazil, Paraguay, Peru, Suriname
Culex investigator Dyar & Knab, 1906
Culex invocator Pazos, 1908 — Cuba
Culex iolambdis Dyar, 1918 — Belize, Colombia, Guatemala, Jamaica, Mexico, Panama, United States, Puerto Rico
Culex isabelae Duret, 1968 — Brazil, Peru
Culex jamaicensis Grabham, 1906
Culex jocasta Komp & Rozeboom, 1951 — Grenada
Culex johnnyi Duret, 1968 — Brazil
Culex johnsoni Galindo & Mendez, 1961 — Colombia, Panama
Culex jonistes Dyar, 1920
Culex jubifer Komp & Brown, 1935 — Brazil, Panama, Venezuela, French Guiana
Culex keenani Galindo & Mendez, 1961 — Panama
Culex kerri Duret., 1968
Culex kummi Komp & Rozeboom, 1951 — Colombia, Nicaragua, Panama
Culex lacertosus Komp & Rozeboom, 1951 — Panama, French Guiana
Culex leprincei Dyar & Knab, 1907
Culex ligator Dyar, 1924
Culex limacifer Komp, 1936 — Belize, Costa Rica, El Salvador, Mexico, Panama
Culex lopesi Sirivanakarn & Jakob, 1979 — Brazil
Culex loturus Dyar, 1925
Culex lucifugus Komp, 1936 — Argentina, Colombia, Ecuador, Trinidad and Tobago, Venezuela
Culex macaronensis Dyar & Nunez Tovar, 1926
Culex madininensis Senevet, 1936 — Saint Kitts & Nevis, Saint Lucia, Guadeloupe, Montserrat, Dominica, Martinique
Culex manaosensis Evans, 1924
Culex maroniensis Bonne-Wepster & Bonne, 1919
Culex martinezi Casal & Garcia, 1968 — Argentina
Culex mastigia Howard, Dyar, & Knab, 1912
Culex maxinocca Dyar, 1920 — Suriname, French Guiana
Culex megapus Root, 1927
Culex menytes Dyar, 1918
Culex merodaemon Dyar, 1921
Culex meroneus Dyar, 1925
Culex mesodenticulatus Galindo & Mendez, 1961 — Panama
Culex milwardi Xavier & Da Silva Mattos, 1972 — Brazil
Culex misionensis Duret, 1953 — Argentina, Brazil
Culex mistura Komp & Rozeboom, 1951 — Brazil, Colombia, Panama, Venezuela, French Guiana
Culex moorei Dyar, 1918
Culex mulrennani Basham, 1948 — Bahamas, Cuba, United States, Cayman Islands
Culex multispinosus Bonne-Wepster & Bonne, 1920
Culex mutator Dyar & Knab, 1906 — Belize, Costa Rica, El Salvador, Mexico, Panama
Culex nicceriensis Bonne-Wepster & Bonne, 1919 — Suriname, Venezuela
Culex ocossa Dyar & Knab, 1919 — Argentina, Brazil, Colombia, Ecuador, Guyana, Panama, Peru, Suriname, Venezuela
Culex oedipus Root, 1927 — Argentina, Brazil, Ecuador, Panama
Culex olimpioi Xavier, Da Silva, & Da Silva Mattos, 1970 — Brazil, Peru
Culex orfilai Duret, 1953 — Argentina
Culex palaciosi Duret, 1968 — Brazil, French Guiana
Culex panocossa Dyar, 1923 — Belize, Colombia, Costa Rica, El Salvador, Guatemala, Jamaica, Mexico, Panama, Venezuela
Culex paracrybda Komp, 1936 — Guatemala, Panama, Suriname
Culex pasadaemon Dyar, 1921
Culex patientiae Floch & Fauran, 1955 — French Guiana
Culex pavlovskyi Casal & Garcia, 1967 — Argentina
Culex peccator Dyar & Knab, 1909 — Cuba, Mexico, United States, Puerto Rico
Culex pedroi Sirivanakarn & Belkin, 1980 — Argentina, Brazil, Colombia, Costa Rica, Ecuador, Guatemala, Guyana, Mexico, Panama, Peru, Suriname, Trinidad and Tobago, Venezuela, French Guiana
Culex penai Sirivanakarn, 1979 — Bolivia, Ecuador
Culex pereyrai Duret, 1967 — Brazil, Paraguay
Culex peribleptus Dyar & Knab, 1917
Culex phlabistus Dyar, 1920 — Brazil, Suriname, French Guiana
Culex phlogistus Dyar, 1920 — Brazil, Colombia, Panama, Suriname, Venezuela, French Guiana
Culex pifanoi Anduze, 1948 — Venezuela
Culex pilosus (Dyar & Knab, 1906) — Argentina, Bahamas, Belize, Bolivia, Brazil, Colombia, Costa Rica, Cuba, Dominican Republic, Ecuador, El Salvador, Guatemala, Honduras, Jamaica, Mexico, Nicaragua, Panama, Paraguay, Peru, Suriname, Trinidad and Tobago, United States, Venezuela, Puerto Rico, French Guiana
Culex plectoporpe Root, 1927 — Brazil, Panama, French Guiana
Culex portesi Senevet & Abonnenc, 1941 — Brazil, Peru, Suriname, Trinidad and Tobago, Venezuela, French Guiana
Culex pose Dyar & Knab, 1917
Culex productus Senevet & Abonnenc, 1939 — Brazil, French Guiana
Culex psatharus Dyar, 1920 — Costa Rica, Ecuador, Panama
Culex pseudotaeniopus Galindo & Blanton, 1954
Culex putumayensis Matheson, 1934 — Brazil, Ecuador, Peru, Suriname, Trinidad and Tobago, French Guiana
Culex quadrifoliatus Komp, 1936 — Panama
Culex quasihibridus Galindo & Blanton, 1954 — Colombia, Panama
Culex rabanicola Floch & Abonnenc, 1946 — French Guiana
Culex rabelloi Forattini & Sallum, 1987 — Argentina, Brazil
Culex rachoui Duret, 1968 — Brazil
Culex radiatus Senevet & Abonnenc, 1939
Culex reductor Dyar & Knab, 1909
Culex ribeirensis Forattini & Sallum, 1985 — Brazil
Culex ronderosi De Linero, 1967 — Venezuela
Culex rooti Rozeboom, 1935 — Argentina, Belize, Colombia, Mexico, Panama, Venezuela
Culex rorotaensis Floch & Abonnenc, 1946 — Brazil, Suriname, French Guiana
Culex ruffinis Dyar & Shannon, 1924
Culex sacchettae Sirivanakarn & Jacob, 1981 — Brazil
Culex saramaccensis Bonne-Wepster & Bonne., 1919 — Ecuador, Suriname, French Guiana
Culex sardinerae Fox, 1953 — Guatemala, Panama, Puerto Rico
Culex seneveti Clastrier, 1970
Culex serratimarge Root, 1927 — Argentina, Bolivia, Brazil, Colombia, Guatemala, Nicaragua, Panama, Paraguay, Peru, Trinidad and Tobago, Venezuela, French Guiana
Culex silvai Duret, 1968 — Brazil
Culex simulator Dyar & Knab, 1906 — Panama, Trinidad and Tobago, Venezuela
Culex spathulatus Forattini & Sallum, 1987 — Brazil
Culex spissipes (Theobald, 1903) — Belize, Bolivia, Brazil, Colombia, Ecuador, Guatemala, Honduras, Mexico, Panama, Peru, Suriname, Trinidad and Tobago, Venezuela, French Guiana
Culex sursumptor Dyar, 1924 — Colombia, Ecuador, Panama, Venezuela
Culex symbletos Sallum & Hutchings, 2003 — Brazil, Peru
Culex taeniopus Dyar & Knab, 1907 — Argentina, Bahamas, Belize, Bolivia, Colombia, Costa Rica, Dominican Republic, Guatemala, Honduras, Jamaica, Mexico, Nicaragua, Panama, Peru, Venezuela, Puerto Rico, Cayman Islands, French Guiana *Culex annulipes Theobald, 1907
Culex tecmarsis Dyar, 1918 — Colombia, Costa Rica, Panama, Venezuela
Culex terebor Dyar, 1920 — Suriname
Culex terepaima Anduze, 1948
Culex theobaldi (Lutz, 1904) — Argentina, Belize, Bolivia, Brazil, Colombia, Costa Rica, Ecuador, Guatemala, Honduras, Mexico, Nicaragua, Panama, Peru, Suriname, Uruguay, Venezuela, French Guiana
Culex thomasi Evans., 1924
Culex tosimus Dyar,
Culex tournieri Senevet & Abonnenc, 1939 — French Guiana
Culex tovari Evans, 1924
Culex trachycampa Dyar & Knab, 1909
Culex trifidus Dyar, 1921 — Costa Rica, El Salvador, Guatemala, Honduras, Mexico, Panama
Culex trigeminatus Clastrier, 1970 — Brazil, French Guiana
Culex trilobulatus Duret & Barreto, 1956 — Brazil
Culex trisetosus Fauran, 1961 — French Guiana
Culex unicornis Root, 1928 — Venezuela, French Guiana
Culex vapulans Dyar, 1920
Culex vaxus Dyar, 1920
Culex venezuelensis Anduze, 1948
Culex vexillifer Komp, 1936 — Belize, Honduras, Panama
Culex vidali Floch & Fauran, 1954 — French Guiana
Culex vogelsangi Anduze, 1948
Culex vomerifer Komp, 1932 — Brazil, Colombia, Ecuador, Panama, Peru, Trinidad and Tobago, Venezuela, French Guiana
Culex wepsterae Komp & Rozeboom, 1951 — Suriname
Culex xivylis Dyar, 1920
Culex ybarmis Dyar, 1920 — Brazil, Suriname, Trinidad and Tobago, Venezuela, French Guiana
Culex zeteki Dyar, 1918 — Belize, Brazil, Colombia, Nicaragua, Panama, Paraguay, Suriname, Trinidad and Tobago, Venezuela, French Guiana

Subgenus Micraedes Coquillett
Culex antillummagnorum Dyar, 1928 — Cuba
Culex arawak Berlin, 1969 — Jamaica
Culex biscaynensis Zavortink & O'Meara, 1999 — United States
Culex bisulcatus Coquillett, 1905 — Trinidad and Tobago, Antilles
Culex erethyzonfer Galindo & Blanton, 1954 — Costa Rica, Panama
Culex jalisco Berlin, 1974 — Mexico
Culex sandrae Berlin, 1969 — Mexico
Culex schicki Berlin, 1969 — Mexico

Subgenus Microculex Theobald
Culex albipes Lutz, 1904 — Brazil
Culex aphylactus Root, 1927 — Brazil
Culex aureus Lane & Whitman, 1951 — Brazil
Culex azymus Dyar & Knab, 1906 — Trinidad and Tobago
Culex carioca Lane & Whitman, 1951 — Brazil, Colombia
Culex chryselatus Dyar & Knab, 1919 — Brazil, Colombia, Ecuador, Panama, Suriname, Venezuela, French Guiana
Culex consolator Dyar & Knab, 1906 — Brazil, Trinidad and Tobago
Culex trychnus Root, 1927
Culex daumastocampa Dyar & Knab, 1908 — Colombia, Costa Rica, Panama
Culex davisi Kumm, 1933 — Brazil
Culex dubitans Lane & Whitman, 1951 — Brazil
Culex elongatus Rozeboom & Komp, 1950 — Colombia, Peru
Culex gairus Root, 1927 — Brazil
Culex gaudeator Dyar & Knab, 1907 — Costa Rica, Panama
Culex hedys Root, 1927 — Brazil
Culex imitator Theobald, 1903 — Argentina, Brazil, Colombia, Ecuador, Guyana, Mexico, Suriname, Trinidad and Tobago, Uruguay, Venezuela, French Guiana
Culex argenteoumbrosus Theobald, 1907
Culex daumasturus Dyar & Knab, 1906
Culex vector Dyar & Knab, 1906 — Brazil
Culex inimitabilis Dyar & Knab, 1906 — Brazil, Grenada, Suriname, Trinidad and Tobago, Venezuela — Brazil
Culex intermedius Lane & Whitman, 1951 — Brazil
Culex jenningsi Dyar & Knab, 1907 — Colombia, Panama
Culex kukenan Anduze, 1942 — Colombia, Venezuela
Culex lanei De Oliveira Coutinho & Forattini, 1962 — Brazil
Culex microphyllus Root, 1927 — Brazil
Culex neglectus Lutz, 1904 — Brazil
Culex pleuristriatus Theobald, 1903 — Bolivia, Brazil, Guyana, Suriname, Trinidad and Tobago, Venezuela, French Guiana
Culex pulidoi Cova Garcia & Sutil Oramas, 1974 — Venezuela
Culex reducens Lane & Whitman, 1951 — Brazil
Culex reginae Floch & Fauran, 1955 — French Guiana
Culex rejector Dyar & Knab, 1906 — Belize, Costa Rica, Guatemala, Mexico, Nicaragua
Culex shopei Forattini & Toda, 1966 — Brazil
Culex siphanulatus Lourenco de Oliveira & da Silva, 1987 — Brazil
Culex stonei Lane & Whitman, 1943 — Brazil, Peru, Suriname, Trinidad and Tobago, French Guiana
Culex sutili Cova Garcia & Pulido F, 1974 — Venezuela
Culex worontzowi Pessoa & Galvao, 1936 — Brazil
Culex xenophobus Ronderos, 1965 — Venezuela

Subgenus Neoculex Dyar
Culex apicalis Adams, 1903 — Mexico, United States
Culex arizonensis Bohart, 1948 — Mexico, United States
Culex boharti Brookman & Reeves, 1950 — United States
Culex chaetoventralis (Theobald, 1910) — Australia
Culex cheesmanae Mattingly & Marks, 1955 — New Caledonia
Culex crassistylus Brug, 1934 — Indonesia
Culex derivator Dyar & Knab, 1906 — Costa Rica, Mexico, Panama
Culex douglasi Dobrotworsky, 1956 — Australia
Culex dumbletoni Belkin, 1962 — New Caledonia
Culex europaeus Ramos, Ribeiro & Harrison, 2003 — Portugal
Culex fergusoni (Taylor, 1914) — Australia
Culex frickii Ludlow, 1906
Culex gamma Séguy, 1924 — Algeria
Culex gaufini Belkin, 1962 — New Caledonia
Culex impudicus Ficalbi, 1890 — Iran, Italy, Morocco, Portugal, Spain
Culex johni Cova Garcia, Pulido F. & Escalante de Ugueto, 1979 — Venezuela
Culex judaicus Edwards, 1926 — Israel, Jordan
Culex latus Dobrotworsky, 1956 — Australia
Culex leonardi Belkin, 1962 — Australia, Solomon Islands
Culex martinii Medschid, 1930 — Bosnia & Herzegovina, Czech Republic, Germany, Hungary, Italy, Morocco, Romania, Slovakia, Tajikistan, Turkey, Uzbekistan, Yugoslavia (Serbia and Montenegro)
Culex millironi Belkin, 1962 — New Caledonia
Culex nematoides Dyar & Shannon, 1925
Culex pedicellus King & Hoogstraal, 1947 — Indonesia
Culex postspiraculosus Lee, 1944 — Australia
Culex pseudomelanoconia Theobald, 1907 — Australia
Culex pyrenaicus Brolemann, 1919
Culex reevesi Bohart, 1948
Culex reevesi Wirth, 1948 — Mexico, United States
Culex rubensis Sasa & Takahashi, 1948 — Japan, Korea, Russia
Culex saxatilis Grossbeck, 1905
Culex sergentii Theobald, 1903
Culex territans Walker, 1856 — Canada, Czech Republic, Germany, Greece, Iran, Iraq, Jordan, Luxembourg, Poland, Portugal, Romania, Russia, Slovakia, Spain, Turkey, United States, Yugoslavia (Serbia & Montenegro, Europe)

Subgenus Nomina Dubia 
Culex aikenii Aiken & Rowland, 1906 — Guyana
Culex americanus Neveu-Lemaire, 1902 — Brazil, Trinidad and Tobago, French Guiana, Antilles
Culex barkerii (Theobald, 1907) — Indonesia, Malaysia
Culex bernardi (Borel, 1926) — Vietnam
Culex chrysothorax (Peryassu, 1908) — Brazil
Culex chrysothorax Newstead & Thomas, 1910 — Brazil
Culex decorator Dyar & Knab, 1906 — Trinidad and Tobago
Culex epirus Aiken, 1909 — Guyana
Culex fasciolatus (Lutz, 1904. In Bourroul 1904) — Brazil
Culex gravitator Dyar & Knab, 1906 — Mexico
Culex humilis Theobald, 1901 — Brazil
Culex indecorabilis (Theobald, 1903) — Brazil
Culex lugens Lutz, 1905 — Brazil
Culex maculatus Von Humboldt, 1819 — Ecuador
Culex microtaeniata Theobald, 1911 — Indonesia
Culex mindanaoensis Baisas, 1935 — Philippines
Culex nigrescens (Theobald, 1907) — Brazil, Venezuela, French Guiana
Culex nigricorpus (Theobald, 1901) — Brazil
Culex novaeguineae Evenhuis, 1989
Culex oblita Lynch Arribalzaga, 1891 — Argentina
Culex pallipes Robineau-Desvoidy, 1827 — Brazil
Culex suborientalis Baisas, 1938 — Philippines
Culex ventralis Walker, 1865 — Papua New Guinea
Culex virgultus Theobald, 1901 — Brazil
Culex vulgaris Linnaeus, 1792 — Sweden

Subgenus Oculeomyia Theobald
Culex albinervis Edwards, 1929
Culex annulioris Theobald, 1901
Culex aurantapex Edwards, 1914
Culex bitaeniorhynchus Giles, 1901 — Djibouti, Gabon, Gambia, Ghana, India, Indonesia, Iran, Japan, Kenya, Korea, Laos, Lesotho, Madagascar, Malaysia, Mozambique, Namibia, Nepal, Nigeria, Pakistan, Palau, Philippines, Russia, Senegal, South Africa, Sri Lanka, Sudan, Taiwan, Tanzania, Thailand, Uganda, Vietnam, Yemen, Zambia, Zimbabwe, New Caledonia, Zaire
Culex cornutus Edwards, 1922
Culex epidesmus (Theobald, 1910)
Culex geminus Colless, 1955
Culex giganteus Ventrillon, 1906
Culex infula Theobald, 1901
Culex kinabaluensis Sirivanakarn, 1976
Culex longicornis Sirivanakarn, 1976
Culex luzonensis Sirivanakarn, 1976
Culex poicilipes (Theobald, 1903)
Culex pseudosinensis Colless, 1955
Culex samoaensis (Theobald, 1914)
Culex selangorensis Sirivanakarn, 1976
Culex sinensis Theobald, 1903 — Bangladesh, China, India, Indonesia, Japan, Korea, Malaysia, Nepal, Papua New Guinea, Philippines, Russia, Sudan, Taiwan, Vietnam, Myanmar
Culex squamosus (Taylor, 1914)
Culex starckeae Stone & Knight, 1958

Subgenus Phenacomyia Harbach & Peyton
Culex airozai Lane, 1945 — Brazil
Culex basilicus Dyar & Knab, 1906
Culex corniger Theobald, 1903 — Belize, Bolivia, Brazil, Colombia, Costa Rica, Cuba, Dominican Republic, Ecuador, El Salvador, Guatemala, Guyana, Haiti, Honduras, Jamaica, Mexico, Nicaragua, Panama, Peru, Suriname, Trinidad and Tobago, Uruguay, Venezuela, French Guiana, Guadeloupe
Culex hassardii Grabham, 1906
Culex lactator Dyar & Knab, 1906 — Mexico
Culex loquaculus Dyar & Knab, 1909
Culex rigidus Senevet & Abonnenc, 1939
Culex subfuscus Theobald, 1907

Subgenus Sirivanakarnius Tanaka
Culex boninensis Bohart, 1956 — Japan

Subgenus Tinolestes Coquillett
Culex breviculus Senevet & Abonnenc, 1939 — Brazil, French Guiana
Culex mojuensis Duret & Damasceno, 1955
Culex cauchensis Floch & Abonnenc, 1945 — Brazil, French Guiana
Culex latisquama (Coquillett, 1905) — Costa Rica, Panama, Suriname, United States

Uncertain subgenus
Culex automartus Root, 1927
Culex cairnsensis (Taylor, 1919) — Australia
Culex flochi Duret, 1969 — Brazil, Colombia, French Guiana
Culex inornata (Theobald, 1905) — Guyana
Culex nicaroensis Duret, 1967 — Cuba
Culex nigrimacula Lane & Whitman, 1943 — Brazil, French Guiana
Culex ocellatus Theobald, 1903 — Bolivia, Brazil, Colombia, French Guiana
Culex punctiscapularis Floch & Abonnenc, 1946 — French Guiana
Culex romeroi Surcouf & Gonzalez-Rincones, 1912 — Venezuela

References 

 Systematic Catalog of the Culicidae: Genus Culex

External links 
on the UF / IFAS Featured Creatures Web site
   Culex (Culex) nigripalpus
   Culex (Melanoconion) iolambdis
 Culex (Melanoconion) pilosus 
 Culex (Culex) quinquefasciatus

 List of species
Culex
Culex